Financial District station is a Detroit People Mover station in downtown Detroit, Michigan. Located on Larned Street in the city's Financial District, the station is attached to 150 West Jefferson, with direct access from the platform to the building's lobby. Financial District is located across the street from the Buhl Building, home to the headquarters of the Detroit Transportation Corporation and SMART. It is also the nearest station to Hart Plaza, One Woodward Avenue, and the Penobscot and Guardian buildings.

The People Mover shut down temporarily on March 30, 2020, due to decreased ridership amid the COVID-19 pandemic. Following the system's May 2022 restart, Financial District station reopened on June 2, 2022.

See also

 List of rapid transit systems
 List of United States rapid transit systems by ridership
 Metromover
 Transportation in metropolitan Detroit

References

External links
 DPM station overview
Larned Street entrance from Google Maps Street View

Detroit People Mover stations
Railway stations in the United States opened in 1987
1987 establishments in Michigan